Dane Tudor (born June 2, 1989) is an Australian / American freeskier born in Sydney, Australia. He spent his time growing up between Palmer, Alaska and Rossland, British Columbia. Tudor still resides in both British Columbia and Alaska.

Skiing career
Tudor is excels in both Big Mountain / Freeskiing and Freestyle skiing. He started skiing at 2 years of age and was ski racing by age 4. He continued to compete in ski racing until the age of 17 before switching full-time to the fast-growing sport of Freeskiing.

He continues to be one of the top placing competitors in the sport.

Sponsors
 Scott
 Red Mountain
 Skullcandy
 Discrete Headwear
 Mons Royale

Filmography
Tudor has appeared in many ski films for Poor Boyz Productions.

 WE - 2012  
 The Grand Bizarre - 2011 
 Revolver - 2010 
 Every Day Is A Saturday - 2009 
 Journal - 2008

Competition results
 1st - 2012 - Swatch Skiers Cup (Team Americas) - Big Mountain - Valle Nevado, Chile 
 4th - 2012 - One Hit Wonder Downunder - Thredbo Alpine Resort, Australia 
 1st - 2012 - Red Bull - Cold Rush, Silverton, Colorado 
 3rd - 2011 - Red Bull - Cold Rush, Silverton, Colorado 
 1st - 2009 - Canadian Open Freeskiing Championship, Rossland, BC
 2nd - 2009 - Tignes Airwaves, Tignes, France (Part of Team North America) 
 1st - 2008 - Canadian Open Freeskiing Championship, Rossland, BC
 3rd - 2008 - US Extreme Freeskiing Championship, Crested Butte, Colorado 
 4th - 2008 - Red Bull - Cold Rush, Rossland, BC
 1st - 2007 - Lake Louise Smith Optics Junior - Big Mountain
 1st - 2007 - Fernie Junior Freeskiing Championships
 2nd - 2007 - Junior Canadian Open Freeskiing Championships
 4th - 2007 - Lord Of The Parks, Slopestyle
 2nd - 2007 - Ontic Rail Jam
 2nd - 2007 - Industrial Surf Triple Crown, Slopestyle
 3rd - 2007 - New Zealand Armageddon, Slopestyle
 1st - 2006 - US Junior Extreme Freeskiing Championships
 1st - 2005 - US Junior Extreme Freeskiing Championships
 1st - 2004 - US Junior Extreme Freeskiing Championships
 1st - 2004 - BC Provincials, Slalom (Canada)
 1st - 2004 - BC Provincials, GS (Canada)
 1st - 2004 - BC Provincials, Overall Champion (Canada)

Industry awards
 2011 IF3 Awards - "Best Male Performance - Nomination"
 2010 ESPN Movie Awards - "Best Male Performance In A Leading Role - Winner" 
 2010 Powder Video Awards - "Breakout Performance - Winner" 
 2010 Powder Video Awards - "Best Male Performance - Nomination" 
 2010 IF3 Awards - "Best Male Performance - Nomination"
 2009 IF3 Awards - "Best Male Performance - Winner" 
 2009 Powder Video Awards - "Best Male Performance - Nomination"

References

External links
 

1989 births
Living people
American male freestyle skiers
Skiers from Sydney
American freeskiers
People from Palmer, Alaska
People from Rossland, British Columbia